Aziz Abdullah Ahmed Mirza (عزيز عبدالله احمد) (1927 – 5 August 2008) was an Iraqi Kurdish judge. He was born in Sulaymaniyah, Kurdistan Region, Iraq, in 1927. He graduated from the Faculty of Law at Baghdad University in 1950. He was a member of the High Court of Cassation from 1996 till 2004 in Erbil, the capital of Kurdistan. He was father of Professor Parosh Abdulla of Uppsala University in Sweden.

He died of Alzheimer's disease on 5 August 2008.

References

1927 births
2008 deaths
Deaths from Alzheimer's disease
20th-century Iraqi judges
People from Sulaymaniyah
University of Baghdad alumni
Deaths from dementia in Iraq
People from Erbil
21st-century Iraqi judges